This is a list of Notable people from Mechelen, who were either born in Mechelen, or spent part of their life there.

Born in Mechelen

Before 17th century

Henry Bate of Malines (1246 – after 1310) philosopher, theologian, astronomer-astrologer, poet, and musician.
Keldermans family of sculptors and architects, including Rombout II Keldermans (14th to 16th century)
Jan Standonck, priest and reformer, Master of the Collège de Montaigu in Paris (1454–1504)
Johannes Varennius (1462–1536), teacher at Collegium Trilingue, wrote: SYNTAXIS LINGVUAE GRAECAE… COLONIAE Martinus Gymnicus excudebat ANNO M.D.L.
Gommaert van der Gracht, painter (c. 1590-1639)
Ferry Carondelet, diplomat and abbot (1473–1528)
Michiel Coxie, Renaissance painter and designer of engravings and tapestries (1499–1592)
Rembert Dodoens, botanist, herbalist, and physician (1517–1585)
Philippe de Monte, Renaissance composer (1521–1603)
Crispin van den Broeck, painter (1523–1591)
Alexandre Colin, sculptor (1526–1612)
Gerhard Dorn, philosopher, translator, alchemist, physician, and bibliophile (c. 1530–1584)
Philips van der Aa, statesman (d. 1586)
Francis Coster, Jesuit and religious writer (1532–1619)
Johan van der Veeken (1549-1616), wealthy shipowner, merchant, banker and cofounder of the VOC Rotterdam.
Rinaldo del Mel, Franco-Flemish composer of the Renaissance (1554-c. 1598)
 François Stella (1563-1605), was a French Baroque painter
David Vinckboons, painter (1576–1629)
Diego de Astor, Spanish engraver and medalist (1587–1650)

17th century until now
Faydherbe family of mostly sculptors, including Lucas Faydherbe (16th and 17th century)
Abraham van den Kerckhoven, organist and composer (c. 1618-c. 1701)
Theodoor Verhaegen, sculptor (1701–1759)
Lodewijk van Beethoven (1712–1770), Kapellmeister and grandfather of his namesake Ludwig van Beethoven
Thomas de Paep, painter (ca. 1628-1630 – 1670)
Jan Coxie, painter (1629 - 1670)
Peter Franchoys, painter (1606 – 1654) 
Lucas Franchoys the Younger, painter (1616 – 1681) 
Jan Philip van Thielen, painter (1618 – 1667) 
Goswin de Stassart, politician (1780–1854)
 Msgr. Victor Scheppers (1802–1877), founder of the Brothers of Mercy of Mechelen and the Scheppersinstituut Mechelen.
Egide Walschaerts, mechanical engineer (1820–1901)
Jef Denyn, musician and founder of the Royal Carillon School (1862–1941)
Rik Wouters, fauvist painter and sculptor (1882–1916)
Jean-Baptiste Janssens, Superior General of the Society of Jesus (1889–1964)
Adèle Colson, musician and first woman graduate of the Royal Carillon School (1905-1997)
Gaston Relens, painter (1909-2011)
Karel Verleye, co-founder of the College of Europe in Bruges (1920–2002)
Philibert Mees, composer and pianist (1929–2006)
Herman De Coninck, poet, essayist, journalist, and publisher (1944–1997)
Luc Van den Brande, politician (b. 1945)
Anne Teresa De Keersmaeker, choreographer (b. 1960)
Bart Somers, politician and mayor (b. 1964)
Steven Defour, football player playing for Royal Antwerp F.C.
Dirk Van de Put, businessman, incoming CEO of Mondelez International

Lived in Mechelen

Margaret of York, Duchess of Burgundy (1446–1503)
Pierre Alamire, music copyist, composer, instrumentalist, mining engineer, merchant, diplomat, and spy (c. 1470–1536)
 Philip the Handsome (also called "the Fair") (1478 – 1506), Duke of Burgundy and the first Habsburg King of Castile.
Margaret of Austria, regent of the Belgium Austriacum, daughter of Maximilian I and guardian of Charles V (1480–1530)
Mary, Eleanor and Isabella of Austria, nieces of Margaret of Austria
John Heywood, English poet (1497-c. 1575)
Charles V, Holy Roman Emperor, born in Ghent, and brought up in Mechelen until age 17 (1500–1558)
Anne Boleyn, future wife of English King Henry VIII (1504–1536).
John Clement, English humanist, tutor of Thomas More's children (16th century)
Viglius, statesman and jurist (1507–1577)
Johannes Secundus, Neo-Latin poet (1511–1536)
Igram van Achelen, statesman (1528–1604)
Franciscus Monachus, geographer and cosmographer (c. 1490-1565) 
François René Mallarmé, French politician in exile (1755–1835)
Pierre François Xavier de Ram, churchman and historian (1804–1865)
Florent Joseph Marie Willems, painter (1823–1905)
Jean Baptiste Abbeloos, orientalist (1836–1906)
Jules Van Nuffel, musicologist, composer, and expert on religious music (1883–1953)
Alice Nahon, poet (1896–1933)
Flor Peeters, composer, organist, and teacher (1903–1986)
Alexander Rubens, Lord of Vremdyck, grandson of the painter Peter Paul.
Maurits Sabbe, writer (1873–1938)

References 

Mechelen
 
Mechelen
Mechelen